Lascelles (pronounced Lassels or 'La-sells') is an English surname of Norman-French origin whose translation means the saddle.  The surname was introduced into England by followers of William the Conqueror after 1066.  Notable people with the surname include:
Alan Lascelles (1887–1981) "Tommy" Lascelles was Private Secretary to both King George VI and Queen Elizabeth II
Alexander Lascelles, Viscount Lascelles
Arthur Moore Lascelles (1880-1918), Captain The Durham Light Infantry VC, MC
Daniel Lascelles (1655–1734), English landowner and politician of Stank and Northallerton, North Riding, Yorkshire
Daniel Lascelles (1714–1784), English landowner, merchant and British politician of Goldsborough Hall
Daniel Lascelles (1902–1967), British ambassador to Japan
David Lascelles, 8th Earl of Harewood, British peer and film and television producer
Edward Lascelles, 1st Earl of Harewood (1740–1820), British peer and politician
Edwin Lascelles, 1st Baron Harewood (1713–1795), British landowner and politician, built Harewood House
Edwin Lascelles (1799–1865), barrister and MP for Ripon from 1846 to 1857
Ernita Lascelles (1890–1972), English actress
Francis Lascelles (1612–1667), Member of English Parliament and New Model Army officer of Stank Hall
Francis William Lascelles (1890–1979), Clerk of the Parliaments 1953-1959
Frank Lascelles (diplomat) (1841–1920), British diplomat, ambassador to Germany and to Russia
Frank Lascelles (pageant master) (1875–1934), British pageant master
George Lascelles, 7th Earl of Harewood, British peer
Gerald Lascelles (disambiguation), multiple people
Henry Lascelles (1690–1753), English merchant, landowner and politician of Harewood, Yorkshire
Henry Lascelles, 2nd Earl of Harewood (1767–1841), British peer and politician
Henry Lascelles, 3rd Earl of Harewood (1797–1857), British peer and politician
Henry Lascelles, 4th Earl of Harewood (1824–1892), British peer
Henry Lascelles, 5th Earl of Harewood (1846–1929), British peer
Henry Lascelles, 6th Earl of Harewood (1882–1947), British peer
Jamaal Lascelles (born 1993), English footballer
James Lascelles (born 1953), British musician and son of the 7th Earl of Harewood
Margaret Lascelles, Viscountess Lascelles (born 1948), the former wife of David Lascelles, Viscount Lascelles
Mary Lascelles (literary scholar) (1900–1995), British literary scholar
Roger de Lascelles, 13th century English nobleman
Thomas Lascelles (British Army officer)
Thomas Lascelles (died 1697), English Member of Parliament
Thomas Lascelles (1624–1658), officer in the New Model Army
Thomas Lascelles (born 1982), son of Jeremy Lascelles
William Lascelles (1798–1851), British politician and son of Henry Lascelles, 2nd Earl of Harewood

See also
William Norman Lascelles Davidson
Earl of Harewood
Lascelles, Victoria, locality in Victoria, Australia
Lascelles was an East Indiaman that sailed for the British East India Company between 1779 and 1799, and that was broken up in 1807 after several years as West Indiaman.
Lascelle, a locality in France.

References